Sven Nielsen may refer to:

Sven Nielsen (French publisher)
Sven Nielsen (Norwegian politician)

See also 
Svend Nielsen (disambiguation)